Bomarea brachysepala is a species of flowering plant in the family Alstroemeriaceae. It is native to Peru and Ecuador. It grows in mountain forest habitat in the Andes. It is threatened by destruction of habitat caused by deforestation and mining.

References

Flora of Peru
Flora of Ecuador
brachysepala
Near threatened plants
Plants described in 1845
Taxonomy articles created by Polbot